Hapugastalawa is a rural town in the Nuwara Eliya District, Sri Lanka.

Geography
Hapugastalawa is located at the edge of the Kothmale Valley with the villages of Halgolla, Harangala, Ruwanpura and Gorakaoya. To the East and South East Hapugastalawa is bounded Halgolla Village which shares the same postcode of 20668. The suburb is predominantly residential with the main shopping area of Hapugastalawa centered between Kothmale, Nawalapitiya Gorakaoya and Gampola roads around the town centre.

Commercial area
The Hapugastalawa commercial area is located near the small lake. The town is organized with specialty stores, supermarkets and many restaurants run by Muslim, Sinhala and Tamil  retailers. The ethnic background of its shoppers has created a hub of restaurants and eateries in the area.

Transport
Hapugastalawa is relatively well served by public transport. Numerous bus services operate from the small interchange. These include the 720 route between Nawalapitiya and Nuwara-Eliya.

Landmarks
Kothmale Dam
Kothmale Mahaweli Maha saya 
Hapugasthalawa Lake
Buddhist Temples 
Mosques

Schools 
Al Minhaj Central College (National School) 
Al Hamidhiyyah Arabic College
An Noor Primary School (1-5 Grades)
Harangala Secondary College
Halgolla Primary School (1-5 Grades)
Siri Sumana Maha Vidyalaya (1-A/L)
Kahira Muslim Maha Vidyalaya (up to A/L Arts stream)
Nanoda Primary School (1-5 Grades)
Gamini Dissanayake National School,Kotmale
Al-Arafa Muslim Vidyalaya (1-11 Grades)
Sri Sanmuga Vidyalaya, Mamippura (1-5 Grades)

Religion

Mosques 
Masjidhul Minhaj (Jumma Masjidh) 

Masjidhul Noor (Jumma Masjidh) 

Masjidhul Manar (Jumma Masjidh)

Masjidhul Abubacker (Jumma Masjidh) 

Masjidhul Hijra (Hurihela) 

Masjidhul Falah (Rockhill)

Masjidhur Rahman (Kaludamada)

Masjidhul Hudha (Mamippura)
Masjidhul Munawwara (Aheswewa Gap)

Buddhist Temples 
Sri Gunarathana Buddhist Center
Sri Sugatha Bimbharamaya
Sri Dharmawijayaramaya
Sri Jayasumanaramaya
Sri Sudharshanaramaya
Halgolla2 Buddhist Temple
Ahaswewa Bhuddhist Temple
Werellapathana Bhuddhist Temple
Sri Kalyanawardhanaramaya
Sri Sambodhi Viharaya
Sri Gangaramaya Buddhist Temple

Hindu Kovils 
Ganadevi Temple

Catholic Churches 
Holy Mount Assembly Church

References

Populated places in Central Province, Sri Lanka